The Calgary Roughnecks are a lacrosse team based in Calgary playing in the National Lacrosse League (NLL). The 2014 season was the 13th in franchise history.

Regular season

Final standings

Game log

Regular season
Reference:

Playoffs

Roster

See also
2014 NLL season

References

Calgary
Calgary Roughnecks seasons
Calgary Roughnecks